Margaret O'Mara (born 1970) is an American historian and professor at the University of Washington.

Background
Margaret O'Mara was born Margaret Pugh on November 15, 1970.

O'Mara received her B.A. from Northwestern University, and her Ph.D. from the University of Pennsylvania.

Career
From 1994 to 1996, O'Mara served as a policy analyst on the staff of Vice President Al Gore.

O'Mara is a past fellow of the Center for Advanced Studies in the Behavioral Sciences at Stanford University. She was an assistant professor in the Department of History at Stanford University (2002-7) before joining the University of Washington.

She is a Distinguished Lecturer of the Organization of American Historians.

Her expertise includes the relations between technology and politics, and between technology companies and urban development. She has written research papers about Silicon Valley and American presidents.

Bibliography
 Cities of Knowledge: Cold War Science and the Search for the Next Silicon Valley, Princeton University Press, 2005,  (reviews)
 Pivotal Tuesdays: Four Elections That Shaped the Twentieth Century, University of Pennsylvania Press, 2015,  (reviews)
 The Code: Silicon Valley and the Remaking of America, Penguin Random House, 2019,

Private life
O'Mara is married to Healthentic CEO and President Jeffery Lawrence O'Mara.

References

External links

1970 births
Living people
21st-century American historians
American women historians
University of Washington faculty
Northwestern University alumni
21st-century American women writers
Stanford University fellows
Historians of technology